Jan Bartosik  (born 8 July 1948 in Szczecin, died 24 October 1995 in Innsbruck) was a sailor from Poland, who competed in the 1980 Summer Olympics in Tallinn as helmsman in the Soling event. Along with crew members Jerzy Wujecki and Zdzislaw Kotla, they took 9th place.

References

1948 births
1995 deaths
Sailors at the 1980 Summer Olympics – Soling
Olympic sailors of Poland
Polish male sailors (sport)